Revaz Shalva Tabukashvili (Rezo) (Georgian: რევაზ თაბუკაშვილი) (2 August 1927 – 5 August 1990) was a Soviet film director and screenwriter.

Early life and education 

He was born on August 2, 1927, in Tbilisi, Georgia. In 1949 he graduated from Moscow State Institute of International Relations.

His poetry and translations were being published since 1940. In 1960s-70s, he was considered as the one of the best translators of William Shakespeare’s sonnets. His plays were regularly performed in Tbilisi's Rustaveli Theatre. He was the author of librettos in operas.

He discovered Georgian manuscripts and important documents in different libraries and archives of the world. Because of him most of those important manuscripts, documents, letters, and pictures were returned in Georgia.

He died on August 5, 1990, and buried in Didube Pantheon.

Personal life 

He was married to Medea Japaridze, a Soviet actress of Georgian origin.

Awards and honors 
Honored Art Worker of the USSR, 1967.
Shota Rustaveli State Prize, 1981.
 A main street in the downtown Tbilisi is named as Revaz Tabukashvili Street.

References 

Soviet film producers
Soviet film directors
People's Artists of Georgia
People from Georgia (country)
Burials at Didube Pantheon
1927 births
1990 deaths